A chief firefighter is a senior officer of a firefighting crew, and the driver of a fire car. In imperial Prussia, the title was known as Brandmeister (from the German Brand - 'fire' and Meister - literally 'master'), and was the police officer and chief of a city firefighting crew. In modern Germany, there are also the posts of Oberbrandmeister (the senior Brandmeister) and Hauptbrandmeister (chief Brandmeister). Conditions of their service in Germany include German citizenship or citizenship of the EU, and a driver's class B license (formerly class III).

In North America, this role can be fulfilled by:

 Fire captain, who leads firefighters based at a fire station or hall
 Fire platoon chief, who is in charge of a smaller team or platoon of firefighters at a fire scene
 Fire lieutenant, who supervises subordinate firefighters and/or operations at the scene of fires and disasters, and may perform some firefighting work

References

Firefighter ranks